The 1993 Durham mayoral election was held on November 2, 1993 to elect the mayor of Durham, North Carolina. It saw the election of Sylvia Kerckhoff, who unseated incumbent mayor Harry E. Rodenhizer Jr. Kerckhoff became the city's first female mayor.

Results

General election

References 

Durham
Mayoral elections in Durham, North Carolina
Durham